Infomercials is an umbrella title for independent, quarter-hour television comedy specials airing on Adult Swim. Unlike actual paid programming, all of the programs are fictitious, and for the most part maintain no continuity with each other.

Most of the specials closely resemble & lampoon the format of infomercials, while others parody tropes in niche media such as closed-circuit hotel information channels, industrial films, sitcoms, outdated reality television formats, and public-access television. A number of the titles have a purposeful standard definition look and framing, to match a dated aesthetic. The specials typically air at 4 a.m. ET/PT.

There is no title card or common identifier for the specials, and on some program guide listings, it can be confused with an actual segment of paid programming; if there is a description, it is sometimes blank, with no season or episode numbers. Every title has a different look, as outside of the Williams Street production logos, there are no common directors, cast or crew between the specials, though some directors have returned.

One in particular, "Too Many Cooks", is notable for gathering media interest in November 2014. It contains a long-form introduction sequence common to 1980s and 1990s TV shows, except with a seemingly endless cast that continued to be introduced for 11 minutes straight.

Specials
All the titles are or have been aired under the homonym banner, according to the Adult Swim schedule.

Scrapped
 The Six Pack Comedy Minute
 Ultimate Beetles Collection

Notes

References

External links
 

2000s American anthology television series
2010s American anthology television series
2020s American anthology television series
2000s American black comedy television series
2010s American black comedy television series
2020s American black comedy television series
2000s American parody television series
2010s American parody television series
2020s American parody television series
2000s American satirical television series
2010s American satirical television series
2020s American satirical television series
2009 American television series debuts
English-language television shows
Adult Swim original programming
Television articles with incorrect naming style